The Ryam Sugar Factory Railway was owned and operated by the Ryam Sugar Factory in Bihar, India.

History 
The Ryam Sugar Factory was incorporated in 1914 as the Tirhut Co-operative Sugar Co Ltd. It was located in a town now known as Raiyam (मैथिली) 15 km north-east of Darbhanga. The factory had two 2 ft (610 mm) narrow gauge railway lines operating as a field system, to bring cane into the factory:
 Line to Mokaddampur, 14 km long, which remained in use until its closure in 1994. 
 Line to SakriStatfold Barn Railway - recently restored locomotive, 10 km long, a station on the 'Darbhanga-Bhaptiahi Branch Line' of the Bengal Nagpur Railway (BNR). This line was closed significantly earlier than the other line.

Stationary steam engines 
In No. 1 Mill stationary steam engine #2619 (1932) by Mirrlees, Watson was used (single cylinder, 24” x 48”, 273 hp, Corliss valves, cost Rs 16000 new). A Nos 2, 3 and 4 Mills stationary steam engine #2423 (1914) by Mirrlees, Watson was installed (single cylinder, 300 hp, piston valves, cost Rs 15000 new).

Locomotives

References 

2 ft gauge railways in India
History of rail transport in Bihar
Railway lines closed in 1994